Mahindra GenZe, doing business as GenZe and also known as GenZe by Mahindra, was a brand of electric bicycles and scooters. It was a subsidiary of the Mahindra Group of India.

History 
In 2013, GenZe introduced their first electric bicycle and electric scooter. The name GenZe was short for Generation Zero Emissions, which was a reference to their products being zero-emissions vehicles.

Operations 
GenZe operated as a subsidiary of the Mahindra Group. Its headquarters were located in Fremont, California. GenZe's products were manufactured, hand-assembled, and road-tested in Ann Arbor, Michigan.

In June 2020, it was announced that GenZe would be closing down its operations.

Products 

GenZe designed and manufactured electric bicycles and electric scooters intended for consumers and corporate fleets.

Electric bicycles 
Their electric bicycles were available through the Ford GoBike public bicycle-sharing system, and the Bike Solar Oakland program in Oakland, California.

Electric scooters 
The GenZe electric scooters were introduced in 2015, and were delivered to consumers in December 2015. They were utilized by Postmates delivery service. They were also available through the Scoot Networks public scooter sharing system, which the Mahindra Group's private-equity business had invested in.

See also 

 List of electric bicycle brands and manufacturers
 Outline of cycling
 Mahindra Two Wheelers

References

External links 

 

Mahindra Group
Scooter manufacturers
Manufacturing companies based in California
Electric scooters
Companies based in Fremont, California
Cycle manufacturers of the United States
Electric bicycles
Electric
Companies with year of establishment missing
American companies disestablished in 2020